Boddam Castle is a ruined castle  in Boddam, Aberdeenshire, Scotland. It was thought to have been built in the early 16th century as a seat for the Keiths of Ludquharn. It is a scheduled monument and was a Category B listed structure, though this was removed in 2015.

Parts of the castle's cannons were still lying sunk in the bank as late as 1776.

See also
List of listed buildings in Peterhead, Aberdeenshire

References

External links
Boddam Castle - Canmore.org.uk
Boddam Castle - CastleForBattles.co.uk

Castles in Aberdeenshire
Scheduled Ancient Monuments in Aberdeenshire
Ruined castles in Aberdeenshire